Michael Alfred Hopfner (January 25, 1947 – April 19, 2009) was a hotel owner, electrical contractor and political figure in Saskatchewan. He represented Cut Knife-Lloydminster from 1982 to 1991 in the Legislative Assembly of Saskatchewan as a Progressive Conservative.

He was born in Humboldt, Saskatchewan and was educated in Lake Lenore and at the Moose Jaw technical school. He served on the town council for Lashburn, also serving as mayor. Hopfner served as government whip in the assembly. He was defeated by Violet Stanger when he ran for reelection in 1991.

Hopfner was found guilty of fraud in for his actions in the Saskatchewan Progressive Conservative scandal of the 1980s and was sentenced to 18 months in jail and ordered to pay $56,000 in restitution.

References

External links
 

1941 births
2009 deaths
Mayors of places in Saskatchewan
People from Humboldt, Saskatchewan
Progressive Conservative Party of Saskatchewan MLAs
Canadian politicians convicted of fraud
Corruption in Canada